Denmark is a civil parish in Victoria County, New Brunswick, Canada.

For governance purposes it is divided between the Indian reserve of Tobique 20 and the local service district of the parish of Denmark, the latter of which is a member of the Northwest Regional Service Commission (NWRSC).

Origin of name
The parish was named for the community of New Denmark.

History of name
Denmark was erected in 1936 from Drummond Parish. Three months later the inland boundary was simplified, returning territory to Drummond.

Boundaries
Denmark Parish is bounded:

 on the northeast by the Restigouche County line, beginning about 5.25 kilometres southeasterly of the end of Chemin Rang 14 and running about 8 kilometres southeasterly;
 on the southeast by a line beginning on the county line and running south 45º west to a point slightly east of the junction of Currie Road with Route 380, then running south-southeasterly and southerly along the Royal Road to a point west of Piccadilly;
 on the south by a line running true east from the northwestern corner of the Tobique 20 Indian reserve on the Saint John River;
 on the west by the Saint John River;
 on the northwest by a line beginning on the Saint John River at the southernmost point of a grant to Lyman Whitehead, about 700 metres south of the mouth of the Salmon River, then running northeasterly and northwesterly along the Whitehead grant to the southeastern line of a grant to John King at a point about 75 metres from the Salmon River, then northeasterly along the King grant until it strikes the Salmon River, then upriver past Route 108 to a point opposite the end of the Salmon River Road, on the northwestern line of a grant to Gabriel C. Poitras, then generally northeasterly along the Poitras grant and the northwestern line of Range 3 of the New Denmark North Settlement and its prolongation, passing the end of Sutherland Brook Road and Salmon River, to the southwestern line of the First Tract of lands granted to the New Brunswick Railway Company, then northwesterly and northeasterly along the First Tract and the prolongation of its northwestern line to the starting point on the Restigouche County line.

Communities
Communities at least partly within the parish. bold indicates an Indian reserve; italics indicate a name no longer in official use

 Bell Grove
 Blue Bell Corner
 Currie Road
 Foley Brook
  Hazeldean (Blue Bell)
 Hilldale Corner
 Lake Edward
  Lerwick
 Medford
  New Denmark
 New Denmark Corner
 New Denmark Station
  North Tilley
  Tobique 20
 Salmonhurst Corner
  South Tilley

Bodies of water
Bodies of water at least partly within the parish.

 Little Salmon River
 Left Hand Branch Pokiok River
  Saint John River
 Salmon River
 Sisson Branch
 Back Lake
 Bear Lake
 Blue Bell Lake
 Lake Edward
 Mazerolle Lake
 Merritt Lake
 Pokiok Lake
 Sisson Branch Reservoir

Other notable places
Parks, historic sites, and other noteworthy places at least partly within the parish.
 Pokiok River Protected Natural Area

Demographics
Population totals do not include portion within Tobique 20 Indian reserve

Population
Population trend

Language
Mother tongue (2016)

See also
List of parishes in New Brunswick

Notes

References

Parishes of Victoria County, New Brunswick
Local service districts of Victoria County, New Brunswick
Danish Canadian settlements